("The Dream Ship") is a German television drama series by ZDF. The series, about a cruise ship that travels to places around the world, debuted in 1981 and became one of the most-watched television shows in Germany. A total of 83 episodes have been produced as of 2019. It was primarily filmed and set aboard the MS Deutschland cruise ship as it sailed to tourist destinations around the world. The destinations depicted are usually the result of product placement. Television producer is Wolfgang Rademann.

In 2007, a Variety magazine article described the series as a Love Boat"-like cruise liner skein.'

Forerunner
The series repeated some clichés that had already successfully been used in Heinz Rühmann's feature film The Captain, which had been based on Richard Gordon's novel The Captain's Table. Romances excluded, the films are reminiscent of the times when sea voyages were more affordable and safer than air travel, at the turn of the 19th century.

Premise 
The premise of the series resembled the American TV series The Love Boat. It presented a place where all kinds of people appeared as guests and could hereby show a variety of extraordinary characters, fates, schemes and relationships. Guests either brought their problems with them or just got into trouble by encountering folks they would not have met under normal circumstances. Still everything would lead to a happy-end in each episode.

Actors 
Captain Heinz Hansen was played by Heinz Weiss who in younger years had been successful on the silver screen as Jerry Cotton's best friend and colleague Phil Decker. When Weiss left the character of Hansen in 1999 he was replaced by Captain Jakob Paulsen, played by Siegfried Rauch. Rauch left the series in 2014 and was followed by Sascha Hehn as Captain Victor Burger with the 2014-screening.

In other media
The series is referenced by several episodes of the drama series Deutschland 86 and Deutschland 89.

References

External links
 Das Traumschiff at ZDF
 

German drama television series
Television series set on cruise ships
1981 German television series debuts
1990s German television series
2000s German television series
2010s German television series
German-language television shows
ZDF original programming